Carrowreagh Court Tomb is a court cairn and National Monument located in County Sligo, Ireland.

Location

History
Carrowreagh Court Tomb was constructed in the Neolithic, c. 4000–2500 BC. A cist was found nearby, 30 m (33 yd) to the SW.

The court was located in the northwest. The gallery is kite-shaped with an entrance 2 m (6½ ft) wide. This widens to over 3 m (10 ft) at the jambs.  There may have been three or four terminal chambers, an unusually high number – it is hard to be exact as the stones are in disarray.

References

National Monuments in County Sligo
Archaeological sites in County Sligo